Liudmila Nikolevna Terenteva (1910 – 9 June 1982) was a Soviet ethnographer and sociologist who primarily studied the Baltic peoples and directed the compilation of a major atlas of the Baltic states. Some of her notable work was on Baltic family and marriage customs. She authored more than one hundred sociological publications during her lifetime.

References 

Soviet ethnographers
1910 births
1982 deaths